Educational Studies in Mathematics is a peer-reviewed academic journal covering mathematics education. It was established by Hans Freudenthal in 1968. The journal is published by Springer Science+Business Media and the editors-in-chief are Susanne Prediger (Technical University of Dortmund) and David Wagner (University of New Brunswick). According to the Journal Citation Reports, the journal has a 2020 impact factor of 2.402.

Editors-in-chief
The following persons are or have been editors-in-chief:
1968-1977: Hans Freudenthal
1978-1989: Alan Bishop
1990-1995: Willibald Dörfler
1996-2000: Kenneth Ruthven
2001-2005: Anna Sierpińska
2006-2008: Tommy Dreyfus
2009-2013: Norma Presmeg
2014-2018: Merrilyn Goos
2019-2020: Arthur Bakker
2021-2022: Arthur Bakker and David Wagner
2022-present: Susanne Prediger and David Wagner

See also
List of mathematics education journals

References

External links

Publications established in 1968
Mathematics education journals
Springer Science+Business Media academic journals
English-language journals